The General's List is a compilation presented by American rapper Tray Deee, released August 20, 2002 on Empire Music Werks. The album features production by Battlecat, DJ Silk, Dr. Dre, Fredwreck, Meech Wells and Tony Touch. It peaked at number 95 on the Billboard 200 and at number 21 on the Billboard Top R&B/Hip-Hop Albums. The album features performances by Snoop Dogg, Tha Eastsidaz, 40 Glocc, L.V., Outlawz, Bad Azz and Kokane. To promote the album, one single was released, for the song, "Izuwitit".

Critical reception 
Tower Records - "...his approach to hip-hop is very much in line with Snoop's style. The classic G-Funk sound jumps out of every track here, that laid-back groove insinuating itself into one's bones...Tray Deee manages the difficult feat of presenting a hardened character comfortable with violence, crime, and misogyny while somehow managing to maintain a light-hearted, even likable tone..."

Track listing

Chart history

References

External links 
[ The General's List] at Allmusic
The General's List at Discogs
The General's List at MusicBrainz
The General's List at Tower Records

2002 compilation albums
Albums produced by Battlecat (producer)
Albums produced by Dr. Dre
Albums produced by Fredwreck
Gangsta rap compilation albums
West Coast hip hop compilation albums
Tray Deee albums